30 Cygni is a class A5III (white giant) star in the constellation Cygnus. Its apparent magnitude is 4.83 and it is approximately 610 light years away based on parallax.

The Bayer letter ο (omicron) has been variously applied to two or three of the stars 30, 31, and 32 Cygni. 30 Cygni has sometimes been designated as ο1 Cygni with the other two stars being ο2 and ο3 respectively. For clarity, it is preferred to use the Flamsteed designation 30 Cygni rather than one of the Bayer designations.

30 Cygni is about six arc-minutes from 31 Cygni A and seven arc-minutes from 31 Cygni B.  That pair is known as ο1 Cygni, while ο2 Cygni is a degree away.  Both ο1 and ο2 are 4th magnitude stars.

References

Cygnus (constellation)
A-type giants
Cygni, 30
Durchmusterung objects
099639
7730
192514